John Keen "Doc" Wilkinson (April 13, 1920 – April 28, 2002) was an American sound engineer. He won an Academy Award for Best Sound and was nominated for another two in the same category. He worked on more than 140 films between 1958 and 1992.

Selected filmography
Wilkinson won an Academy Award for Best Sound following his work on the Hiroshima and Nagasaki bombings in 1945. He was later nominated for another two in the same category, but this time regarding the effort he put into his work in Vietnam.

Won
 Platoon (1986) (Academy Award for Best Sound Mixing)

Nominated
 Days of Heaven (1978) (Academy Award for Best Sound Mixing)
 Outland (1981) (Academy Award for Best Sound Mixing)

References

External links

1920 births
2002 deaths
American audio engineers
Best Sound Mixing Academy Award winners
People from Hartford, Connecticut
Engineers from Connecticut
20th-century American engineers